Mayakonda  is a village in the southern state of Karnataka, India. It is in the Davanagere taluk of Davanagere district.

Demographics
 India census, Mayakonda had a population of 5723 with 2933 males and 2790 females.

References

Villages in Davanagere district